Clouds of Glass is a 1958 Czechoslovak short film directed by František Vláčil. It is Vláčil's last film in Military studio.

Reception

Accolades

External links

References

1958 films
Czechoslovak short films
Czech short films
Czech drama films
1950s Czech-language films
Films directed by František Vláčil
1950s Czech films